Masbateño or Minasbate is a member of Central Philippine languages and of the Bisayan subgroup of the Austronesian language family spoken by more than 724,000 people in the province of Masbate and some parts of Sorsogon in the Philippines. Masbatenyo (sometimes written as Masbateño) is the name used by the speakers of the language and for themselves, although the term Minásbate is sometimes also used to distinguish the language from the people. It has 350,000 speakers , with 50,000 who speak it as their first language. About 250,000 speakers use it as their second language.

Masbatenyo is closely related to Capiznon, with 79% lexical similarity, and Hiligaynon, with 76% lexical similarity. Waray language is closely related and significantly similar to Masbatenyo as well. It is also closely related to Waray Sorsogon language, the language of Sorsogon. This is because Masbate was once part of Sorsogon Province and was governed from Sorsogon City until the 1920s. It has three major dialects: the western dialect centered around the town of Balud on the western coast which is close to Capiz, the southern dialect centered about the town of Cataingan in the southeastern part of Masbate, and the northern dialect covering the whole northern half of Masbate and centered on Masbate City.

Etymology 
There are several accounts on the origins of the word Masbate. One account says that it came from the words  'to mix' and  'to beat'. The other account says it came from  'heard better' as in  'Get down here and get closer so that we can hear better whatever you're saying.' Another account further says that it came from the term that Cebuano migrants used to describe the place, which means 'a place where living condition is worse'.

Another claims that the name Masbate came from Masbad. The term Masbad possibly originated from Masbaranon, a barrio that used to be part of the jurisdiction of the Municipality of Placer but is now under the Municipality of Esperanza. This barrio used to be called Surosimbahan because it looks like a church. Its name was then changed Agoho from the tree called agoho. Then, for the third time, its name was changed to  Masbaranon because of the supposed abundance of small fish called .

Dialects 
Wolfenden identified three major dialects of Masbatenyo: the western dialect centered around the town of Balud on the western coast which is close to Capiz, the southern dialect centered about the town of Cataingan in the southeastern part of Masbate and the northern dialect covering the whole northern half of Masbate and centered on Masbate City, the capital.

Masbatenyo and its neighboring languages 
Wolfenden  reported that although Sorsogon (the southernmost province of Bicol) and Masbate are very much closer to Bicol Peninsula, Sorsoganon and Masbatenyo shared the same grammatical systems which are rather closer to those of Waray and Hiligaynon, the trade languages in the Visayas, rather than that of Bicol.

The presence of competing grammatical and lexical subsystems in the language is the most striking characteristic of Masbatenyo. This has probably been brought on by the influx of settlers from surrounding major language groups who mixed in elements of their language with and alongside of the Masbatenyo. This results to a number of semantic concepts that can be expressed by two to five alternate different words for a single concept.

This led Wolfenden to think that Masbatenyo is unique in the sense of its being a mixed-up language. Speakers of the language often thought that their language is just a mixture of its neighboring languages which are Bikol, Waray-Waray, Cebuano, Hiligaynon and Tagalog. There are still who refer to their own speech as 'Bisaya'.

Masbatenyo shares different types of mutual intelligibility with its neighboring languages. Speakers of Masbatenyo can easily and conveniently converse with speakers of the neighboring languages using their own language. However, speakers of Cebuano, Waray or Hiligaynon would sometimes find it difficult to understand Masbatenyo because of its lexicon. Furthermore, Zorc  considered Masbatenyo, together with Kinaray-a, Bulalakaw, Hiligayon, Waray, and Surigaonon, as "linking dialects" because they serve as "centers of dialect complexes".

McFarland presented different views on the classification of the language spoken in Masbate. One view excluded Masbate and the southern part of Sorsogon from the Bikol area on the grounds that the language spoken in these areas was not Bikol. The other view considered the language as dialect of Bikol.

Other claim on the language of Masbate was that 'the language and dialects of Masbate are basically Visayan, with the major influence being Cebuano.' Zorc made a subgrouping and reconstruction of the Bisayan dialects and included Masbatenyo in his work. He stated that while it is true that there are immigrants from the areas that speak Bikol, Cebuano and Hiligaynon languages, the "native dialect" throughout the island is Masbatenyo.

Zorc presented four types of intelligibility among the Bisayan languages and dialects: a) natural or primary intelligibility, where speakers of different dialects can communicate freely, even they never hear the other dialect before (e.g. Bulalakawnon and Ratagnon, Capiznon and Hiligaynon); b) learned or secondary intelligibility, where speakers can adjust to another dialect in a matter of time (e.g. Bulalakawnon and Aklanon); c) sesquilingualism, whereby a speaker is fluent in his native language (dialect), but can only understand (not speak) another (Waray and Cebuano, where speakers of both languages can understand both perfectly but speakers of Cebuano understand Waray poorly); and d) one-way intelligibility, whereby A understands B but B does not understand A.

Masbatenyo speakers in the town of Masbate belong to the fourth kind. The residents of the town can readily understand the speech of the outsiders but the outsiders cannot understand the speech of the local residents. Speakers can understand Sorsoganon, Capiznon, Hiligaynon, and Cebuano but the latter experience varying degrees of difficulty in understanding Masbatenyo.

Regarding the duration of the Bisayan occupancy of the Central Philippines, Zorc reported that there are no pre-Hispanic writings that would account for their existence in the area. Zorc stipulated that current speakers of many of the Bisayan languages and dialects could have given up their original languages long ago in favor of an intrusive or more prestigious language, or in favor of the language already spoken in the region that they invaded and conquered.

Orthography 
In 2016, researchers from the Dr. Emilio B. Espinosa Sr. Memorial State College of Agriculture and Technology (DEBESMSCAT) together with the members of newly established Minasbate Language Society, composed of various stakeholders from Masbate, developed a working orthography on the language based on the discussions in the 1st Minasbate Orthography Congress.

The Minasbate Working Orthography distinguishes between the native Minasbate orthography and the extended working orthography.

A. Native Minasbaté Orthography

 The following symbols are used in the native Minasbaté orthography:
Aa, Bb, Dd, Gg, Hh, Ii, Kk, Ll, Mm, Nn, NGng, Pp, Rr, Ss, Tt, Uu, Ww, Yy, ` (for glottal stop)
 Minasbaté has three phonemic vowels (V): Aa, Ii, Uu and 16 consonants (C): Bb, Dd, Gg, Hh, Kk, Ll, Mm, Nn, NGng, Pp, Rr, Ss, Tt, Ww, Yy, ` (for glottal stop).
 The glottal stop is a distinct consonant sound in Minasbaté and part of its alphabet. The grave accent ( ` ) will be used to represent the glottal stop.
 The glottal stop may occur between a C and V, e.g , 
 It may also occur in the final position of the word, e.g. , 
 The glottal may also occur between two V, e.g.
 The glottal stop is also the obligatory onset of the written syllable that begins with a vowel. It will be symbolized when the word begins with a vowel, e.g.
 The syllable pattern of Minasbaté words is CV and CVC, e.g.  = CV.CVC.
 All Cs can occur in the beginning of a word (onset) or ending (coda). Examples:  'thirsty,'  'to catch'
 All Vs are used to form a syllable nucleus. Examples:
 In writing stress or accent, the acute accent ( ' ) above the V is used, e.g. , 'alive', 'big',  'noise'.
 A stressed non-final syllable is usually lengthened. For example, in the case of  'life' vs  'alive', the syllable  in 'life' is longer than the syllable  in 'alive'.
 It is possible to have more than one stress in a word, e.g. , .
 The stress is symbolized by the acute accent ( ' ) if it falls on the last syllable, e.g. , . The stress may not be symbolized if it falls on the penultimate syllable, e.g.  'night',  'eyebrow'.

B. Extended Orthography

The inclusion of borrowed terms in native Minasbaté vocabulary has resulted in the change in the structure of the language. There is a need to develop an extended orthography to accommodate these words.

 The extended orthography will consist of the following:
 Aa "ey", Bb "bi", Cc "si", Dd "di", Ee "I", Ff "ef", Gg "ji", Hh "eych", Ii "ay", Jj "jey", Kk "key", Ll "el", Mm "em", Nn "en", Ññ "enye", NGng "en ji", Oo "o", Pp "pi", Qq "kyu", Rr "ar", Ss "es", Tt "ti", Uu "yu", Vv "vi", Ww "dobol yu", Xx "eks", Yy "way", Zz "zi", ` (for glottal stop)
 All Minasbaté words (native and borrowed) use a, i, e, o and u. The "i" and "e" are indistinct and alternate in written native words and so are/do "o" and "u." The alternation rules are explained below. The "i" and "e" are distinct in borrowed words (e.g.  vs. ).
 The use of the back vowels "u" and "o":
 If the word has only one back vowel sound that occurs in the ultimate position, o is used. Exceptions: 
 If the word has more than two back vowels, u is used in the second or third to the last syllable and o is used in the final syllable.
 O in borrowed words is retained in writing.
 The use of front vowels "i" and "e":
 All Minasbaté words with an "i" sound will be written as i.
 e in borrowed words will be retained in writing.
 The hyphen will be used in the following instances:
 Reduplication of full words, e.g.  'toy',  'little house',  'improvised stove'
 Compound words, e.g.  'conjunctivitis',  'very easy',  'indecisive'
 Affixation of borrowed words that are proper names, e.g. 
 Time expressions, e.g.
 The hyphen will be used in the following instances:
 Partial reduplication of the word, e.g.
 Affixation of native root words, e.g.
 Affixation of borrowed verbs and nouns, e.g.
 Linkers, not .
 In writing borrowed words, the equivalent sounds in the native Minasbaté will be used to represent the borrowed sounds. The following symbols are used to represent the borrowed sounds:

8. Consonant clusters exist in both native and borrowed words in Minasbaté.

9. The apostrophe symbol ( ' ) is used in contracted words. The unstressed vowel can also be deleted in fast speech.

Examples:

Phonology 
Masbatenyo has 19 segmental phonemes: 16 consonant sounds  and three vowel sounds .  has the mid front unrounded, lax vowel  (written orthographically as e) as its variant;  has the mid back rounded lax  (written orthographically as o) as its variant.

The glottal stop  is the conventional onset of the orthographically vowel-initial words, thus vowels cannot occur in initial position. They only occur in medial and final position.

There are two major syllable patterns in Masbatenyo, namely, open syllable /C(C)V, (C(C)VC)/ and closed syllable /CVC/. Most root words in Masbatenyo are disyllabic (they are composed of two syllables) and follows the CV(C).CV(C) pattern. There are monosyllabic words; however, most of them are functors that have no lexical meaning. Most of the disyllabic words contain an affix, reduplicated or compound.

Masbatenyo also has a suprasegmental phoneme, the stress, which is characterized by vowel length. The acoustic analysis of stress correlates using Praat showed that duration is the most consistent factor that characterizes stress. Stressed syllables are longer than their unstressed counterparts.

Consonant clusters are non-native to Masbatenyo phonology. Their occurrence in the language is brought by the entry of borrowed words from Spanish and English.

The form of a morpheme can changed when they are combined to form words or phrases. Such changes are called mophophonemic changes.

Grammar

Word formation 
Masbatenyo provides support for the claim that root words are pre-categorial or neutral by themselves. Take the following examples:  'big (size, abstract)' is a root which can express a property or state, as seen in:  'His house is big'. But it can also be combined with certain affixes to form a process verb in:  'His pet has grown already.' It can also combine with a determiner, to form a noun in the context:  'I didn't see his child growing up.'

 is considered a verb when used in command form:  'Run!' 'His truck runs slowly.'

Masbatenyo employs the following operations in deriving new words:

 Affixation, the process to which an affix is attached to a root or an 'intermediate stem; e.g.  + m- >  'ugly';
 Reduplication, the repetition of word or part of word to form a new word; e.g.,  + PWr reduplication >  'mini boat';
 Stress shift, e.g.,  'pay' >  'paid'

However, the existence of bare root forms of modifiers (adjectives and adverbs) in Masbatenyo can also provide evidence that root forms also have lexical properties. Examples of this are  'fresh (fish)' versus  'rotten',  'raw' versus  'cooked'.

Noun and noun phrases 

In Masbatenyo, there is a subgroup of common nouns that can be inflected as imitative. The imitative affix can be the reduplicative or the  'imitative/diminutive'. The reduplicative affix – the reduplication of the whole word – is applicable to a stem that is disyllabic and has open penult (CV). Regardless of the original position of the stress, the stress of the reduplicated form is always in the penult, such as in  'man'  >  'toy'

The  is attached to a stem that has more than two syllables. It also attaches to a stem that has a close penult (CVC). The stress does not shift after reduplication. An example of this is  'boat' >  'mini-boat'

The meaning, however, is no longer imitative. It means 'every …' as illustrated in  'day' >  'everyday'.

Nouns can also be derived from other word classes by adding nominalizing morphemes or voice affixes.

Verbs 
Masbatenyo verbs, like verbs in other Philippine languages, are marked for their voice, aspect and modality. Further, as Nolasco observed in Philippine languages, voice and tense/aspect/mode often interact and it is sometimes difficult to tease them apart.

Aspect 
Masbatenyo is marked for aspect to show the condition of the action; whether it has begun or not, and whether it is viewed as a process or in a static state. What is important to the speakers is not a temporal relation of the activity to the moment of speaking, but the internal stages of the activity. It is not marked for tense since its action is not correlated with time.

Masbatenyo has the five aspects: infinitive or neutral, perfective, imperfective, prospective and recent perfective.

Mode 
Mode describes the speakers' attitude toward a situation, including the speakers' belief in its reality, or likelihood (Payne 1997). It describes the view of the speaker as to how the action is done. The term mode, mood and modality are often used interchangeably. There are at least six types of mode that occur in Masbatenyo: (a) indicative; (b) imperative; (c) aptative/abilitative; (d) reciprocal/social; (e) causative; and (f) distributive.

Modifiers 
In Masbatenyo, the so-called "adjectives" and "adverbs" are similar morphologically; hence, there exists no persuasive reasons for separating the modifiers of verbs and non-verbs.

Modifiers can either occur in their root forms or they can be inflected by affixes. The first type belongs to a class of unaffixed form of statives. These forms denote that the properties they exhibit are not derived from a process or those that are possessed innately by the thing being described. Examples are  'fresh (fish)' versus  'rotten',  'raw' versus  'cooked'.

Affixed forms of the statives are classified according to the affix that attaches to their root forms. There are three types of affixed forms in Masbaenyo: (a) m- type; (b) hi-/ha- type; and (c) those with voice affix. The first subtype inflected for by the m- replacive affix expresses the state or attribute of the referent or entity being described, e.g.,  'dark'.

The second subtype, which is inflected for by the hi-/ha-, is used to describe measurements (depth, height, length), e.g.,  'far';  'high'.

The third subtype is affixed with voice affix.

Masbatenyo modifiers are inflected by means of affixes for four degrees of intensity: basic, comparative, superlative, and intensive.

  'Chai is a kind child.' (Basic)
  'Benj is more beautiful.' (Comparative)
  'Karl is the fastest.' (Superlative)

In Masbatenyo, intensive degree is expressed by the affix ka- accompanied by the non-obligatory particle  attached to bare forms (roots), e.g.  'Tinne's voice is so beautiful.'

Intensive degree may also be expressed by  reduplication. ka- intensification also co-occurs with the Curu intensification.  'This rice cake is very sweet.'

Adverbial properties in Masbatenyo are rather expressed by clitic particles such as  'already',  'still',  'really',  'reportedly', etc.

Pronouns 
In Philippine-type languages, pronouns replace the full noun phrases in a clause. Pronouns, however, do not take the place of nouns in most expressions (e.g.  > , not ), but do so in oblique phrases (e.g.  'to the child' >  'to him/her.'

There are five important types of pronouns in Philippine languages: personal pronouns, interrogative pronouns, demonstrative pronouns, reflexive pronouns and indefinite pronouns.

Personal pronouns refer to entities already mentioned in the discourse or known to the hearer. They are classified according to person, case and number.

Demonstrative pronouns or deictics refer to entities in relation to distance, and space and also refer to their location on a timeline. In discourse, demonstratives are also used to track reference across clauses. They sometimes take the place of third personal pronouns.

Interrogative pronouns are those that take place of the nouns in questions. Interrogatives are used when a concept is being questioned and to elicit information so that an item can be identified. The interrogative pronouns are  'who',  'what',  'how',  'when',  'how much',  'where', and  'where'.

 'why' differs from the rest of interrogative words since it does not replace a noun phrase but an entire clause. It consists of the interrogative pronoun  and the reason particle .

Reflexive pronouns are special words which refer to the same referent in a construction.

Indefinite pronouns refer to entities, persons, places or times which cannot be clearly established. The indefinite pronouns can either be expressed in two ways: (a) by the same form as the interrogatives plus the particle  or (b) by the use of the connectors  'even, including',  'even though' or  'if' plus interrogative word.

 is a general pro-form that can be used to replace any noun, verb, modifier, or even whole clauses.

Numeral terms 
Masbatenyo has native terms for numbers. However, in the domain of money and time, Spanish terms are used. Numerals typically go with nouns to specify the number of items talked about. They can also modify verbs and other predicates to indicate degree and quantity of action.

Basic mathematical operations 
The following are basic mathematical operations in Masbateño:
one plus one equals two            (1 + 1 = 2)    –  
two times two equals four          (2 x 2 = 4)    –  
eight minus five equals three      (8 – 5 = 3)    –  
nine divided by three equals three (9 ÷ 3 = 3)    –

Advanced algebraic operations 
The following are advanced algebraic operations in Masbateño:
x raised to the power of y, or in symbols, (x^y). In Minasbate, .
square root of x, or in symbols, sqrt(x). In Minasbate, .
x over y, or in symbols, x/y. In Minasbate, .
one and a half plus two and one-fourth equals three and three-fourths, or in symbols, 1 1/2 + 2 1/4 = 3 3/4. In Minasbate, .

Useful terms and expressions

Parts of the body

Animals

Adjectives/Modifiers

Common phrases 
I hate you! –  / 
I love you. –   (Bicolano-influenced)
I love you. –  (Masbate Mainland)
Let's talk. – 
Can I join? – 
Pleased to meet you. – 
How you doin'? – 
Please let me know. – 
Please help me. – 
Can you teach me? –  
I want to learn Masbatenyo. – 
Good morning! – 
Good afternoon! – 
Good evening! – 
Good night! – 
Let's eat. – 
You're (really) beautiful. – .
Please call me. – 
Can I ask you a favor? –

Literary works

References

External links
https://masbatenyo.webonary.org/ – Dictionary by SIL

Visayan languages
Languages of Masbate
Bikol languages